Momordicilin or 24-[1′-hydroxy,1′-methyl-2′-pentenyloxyl]-ursan-3-one is a chemical compound, a triterpenoid with formula , found in the fresh fruit of the bitter melon (Momordica charantia).

The compound is soluble in ethyl acetate and chloroform but not in petrol. It crystallizes as needles that melt at 170−171 °C.  It was isolated in 1997 by S. Begum and others.

See also 
 Momordicin I
 Momordicin-28
 Momordicinin
 Momordenol
 Momordol

References 

Triterpenes
Ketones